Scissurella evaensis is a species of sea snail, a marine gastropod mollusk in the family Scissurellidae.

Description

Distribution

References

 Geiger D.L. & Jansen P. (2004). New species of Australian Scissurellidae (Mollusca: Gastropoda: Vetigastropoda) with remarks on Australian and Indo-Malayan species. Zootaxa 714:1–72.
 Geiger D.L. (2012) Monograph of the little slit shells. Volume 1. Introduction, Scissurellidae. pp. 1–728. Volume 2. Anatomidae, Larocheidae, Depressizonidae, Sutilizonidae, Temnocinclidae. pp. 729–1291. Santa Barbara Museum of Natural History Monographs Number 7

Scissurellidae
Gastropods described in 1998